Frank Corrado (born March 26, 1993) is a Canadian former professional ice hockey defenceman. He was selected by the Vancouver Canucks in the fifth round, 150th overall, of the 2011 NHL Entry Draft. Corrado made his NHL debut for the Canucks during the 2012-13 season. He also played for the Toronto Maple Leafs and Pittsburgh Penguins.

Playing career

Junior
Corrado played with the Vaughan Kings minor midget AAA team in the GTHL during the 2008–09 season where he scored 15 goals and added 33 assists in 62 games. He was selected by the Sudbury Wolves in the second round, 25th overall, in the OHL Priority Draft.

In his rookie season in the Ontario Hockey League, Corrado played in 63 games, scoring 1 goal. He followed that up by playing 67 of 68 regular season games in the following season. His offensive output more than tripled as he registered 4 goals and 30 points. He then added another goal and four assists in eight playoff games.

Corrado was selected by the Vancouver Canucks in the fifth round, 150th overall, in the 2011 NHL Entry Draft. After a successful first NHL training camp with the Canucks, Corrado signed his 3-year entry level contract with the Canucks on September 23, 2011 before being returned to Sudbury.

Corrado made his professional hockey debut on April 7, 2012 with the Chicago Wolves after Sudbury was eliminated from the OHL playoffs. Corrado appeared in four regular season games, registering one assist. He also played in two playoff games before Chicago was eliminated from the playoffs by San Antonio.

On January 8, 2013, Frank Corrado was traded from the Sudbury Wolves to the Kitchener Rangers.  On April 15, 2013, Corrado was assigned to the Chicago Wolves.

Professional

Vancouver Canucks 
On April 22, 2013, Corrado made his NHL debut against the Chicago Blackhawks. He logged 17:20 of ice time and had three hits. The Canucks kept Corrado for their opening round playoff sweep by the San Jose Sharks, thus eating the first year of his Entry Level Contract.

He scored his first career NHL goal on April 14, 2014 on a wrist shot against goaltender Karri Rämö of the Calgary Flames.

Toronto Maple Leafs 
On October 5, 2015, the Canucks placed Corrado on waivers.  He was claimed by the Toronto Maple Leafs the following day. When commenting on the matter, Corrado said it was a "dream come true" to play for his hometown team. Corrado would however remain a healthy scratch for 10 weeks, finally making his Toronto debut on December 15, 2015, in a 5–4 overtime loss to the Tampa Bay Lightning (Corrado had spent two weeks with the Marlies as part of a conditioning stint during this near 3-month span). This prolonged wait is likely attributed to the Maple Leafs' desire for Corrado to improve his strength in the gym, as well as an overabundance of defencemen on the roster.

On July 25, 2016, Corrado signed a 1-year, $600 000 with the Toronto Maple Leafs.

The 2016–17 campaign again saw Corrado a frequent healthy scratch, though this time he saw even less playing time. Corrado had played just one game by the new year, admitting he was frustrated with his role as the team's "bench warmer." In mid December, Corrado made controversial comments stating that he wasn't playing because head coach Mike Babcock wasn't fond of him, though general manager Lou Lamoriello did comfort him on the situation. The comments brought return remarks from Babcock and significant fan and media attention to Corrado's situation, sparking a "Free Corrado" social media campaign. In an effort to receive more playing time, he was loaned to the Marlies for a seven-game conditioning stint. Corrado would play one more game on January 19 (due to an injury to Morgan Rielly), but a poor performance resulted in him being a further healthy scratch. On February 4, following the acquisition of fellow right handed defenceman Alexei Marchenko via waivers, the Maple Leafs placed Corrado on waivers for the purpose of sending him to the AHL. General manager Lou Lamoriello stated he hoped Corrado was selected off waivers, saying he deserved an opportunity to play in the NHL. However, he cleared the following day.

Pittsburgh Penguins
Corrado played with the Marlies until the March 1 NHL Trade Deadline, where he was sent to the Pittsburgh Penguins in exchange for Eric Fehr, Steven Oleksy and a 2017 fourth round pick. He was directly assigned to AHL affiliate, the Wilkes-Barre/Scranton Penguins. On December 7, 2017, he was recalled from the Wilkes-Barre/Scranton Penguins to replace Justin Schultz who was placed on Injured Reserve. Corrado's tenure in Pittsburgh was characterized by injury issues.

Return to AHL
At the conclusion of his contract with the Penguins, Corrado was not tendered a contract resulting in unrestricted free agent status. Corrado was un-signed over the summer and leading into the 2018–19 season, before opting to sign a standard AHL one-year playing contract in a return to the Toronto Marlies on October 22, 2018.

As an unsigned free agent the following off-season, Corrado continued his professional career in the AHL for the 2019–20 season, agreeing to a professional tryout contract with the Belleville Senators, affiliate of the Ottawa Senators, on October 26, 2019. He was later signed to a one-year AHL deal with the Senators, appearing in 36 games for 10 assists before the season was cancelled due to COVID-19.

Europe
As an impending free agent, Corrado opted to pursue a career abroad, agreeing to a one-year contract with Swedish club, Modo Hockey of the second tier HockeyAllsvenskan on June 1, 2020. In the following 2020–21 season, Corrado re-established his offensive acumen from the blueline, registering 4 goals and 17 points through 34 regular season games with Modo.

On May 10, 2021, Corrado left Sweden as a free agent, signing a contract with Latvian based club, Dinamo Riga of the KHL. In November 2021, after seven games with Riga, Corrado and the team mutually agreed to contract termination after Corrado discovered an injury.

Broadcast sports analyst
Following his departure from professional hockey, Corrado became a hockey analyst with Canadian television sports network TSN.

Personal life
Corrado is of Italian descent. Growing up, he was a fan of the Toronto Maple Leafs. In a November 2021 interview, Corrado stated that he still cheered for the team despite his mixed tenure with the club, and watches Maple Leafs games on television when he is able to.

Career statistics

References

External links 
 

1993 births
Living people
Belleville Senators players
Canadian ice hockey defencemen
Canadian people of Italian descent
Chicago Wolves players
Ice hockey people from Toronto
Kitchener Rangers players
Modo Hockey players
Pittsburgh Penguins players
Sudbury Wolves players
Toronto Maple Leafs players
Toronto Marlies players
Utica Comets players
Vancouver Canucks draft picks
Vancouver Canucks players
Wilkes-Barre/Scranton Penguins players